The Acorn class (officially redesignated the H class in 1913) was a class of twenty destroyers of the Royal Navy all built under the 1909-1910 Programme, and completed between 1910 and 1911. The Acorns served during World War I.

Design
This change allowed a smaller vessel than the Beagles even with an increase in armament.

While the detailed design of earlier destroyer classes was left to the builders resulting in individual ships differing considerably, this changed for the Acorns, where a standard hull design was used, allowing more shipyards to bid for orders, thus driving down costs, while reducing the time and effort required for the Admiralty to check and approve each builder's designs. Machinery design, however, was still left to the builders, although it had to fit into the space allowed in the standard design. They had a reasonably uniform appearance, with three funnels, a tall, thin fore funnel, a short, thick central and a short narrow after stack.

Displacement was  normal and  full load. Nineteen of the twenty ships of the Acorn class had three propeller shafts driven by Parsons steam turbines, fed by four boilers (White-Forster boilers in the three J. Samuel White-built ships, (and ), Yarrow boilers in the remaining ships), with the boiler out-takes routed to three funnels. The remaining ship of the class, the John Brown & Company-built , had a two shaft arrangement powered by Brown-Curtis impulse turbines. The ships were required to reach , the same speed as the Beagle class, which was expected to need . The ships had a crew of 72 officers and men.

The revised machinery layout freed up deck space, allowing heavier armament to be carried. Gun armament consisted of two  BL Mk VIII guns, one on the ship's forecastle and one aft, and two 12-pounder (76 mm) QF 12 cwt guns carried in the waist position between the first two funnels. Unlike the Beagles, the forecastle gun was not raised on a bandstand, as it was felt that in heavy seas this generated additional spray. As with the Beagles, torpedo armament consisted of two  torpedo tubes, with two reload torpedoes carried, although the tubes were longer, allowing more modern torpedoes to be carried. The torpedo tubes were aft of the funnels, mounted singly with a searchlight position between them. Wartime modifications included the addition of a 3-pounder (47 mm) Vickers anti-aircraft gun and depth charges.

Service

On commissioning, between December 1910 and February 1912, the ships of the class joined the 2nd Destroyer Flotilla of the Royal Navy's Home Fleet, replacing s. They were officially redesignated the H class in October 1913 as part of a general re-designation of the Royal Navy's destroyers.

The ships of the class remained members of the 2nd Flotilla on the outbreak of the First World War, when the flotilla became part of the Grand Fleet. Some ships of the class were sent to the Mediterranean in 1915, with all surviving ships eventually being transferred there. Two of the class ( and ) were loaned to the Imperial Japanese Navy in 1917, being renamed Sendan and Kanran, and were returned in 1919.

Following the end of the war, the Royal Navy quickly disposed of large numbers of older ships, including the Acorn class. All remaining ships of the class had been sold for scrap by the end of 1921.

Ships

References

Notes

Citations

Bibliography

External links

 
Destroyer classes
Ship classes of the Royal Navy